Des McLean is a Scottish stand-up comedian, actor, and a presenter for radio and television from Glasgow. Billy Connolly has cited McLean as his favourite comedian.

McLean started working in comedy in 1999, and was a finalist in both the BBC New Comedy Awards and the Channel 4 programme So You Think You’re Funny?. In 2002 McLean made his debut at the Edinburgh Festival Fringe with his one-man show Des McLean 5 Stars and appeared on the BBC series Live Floor Show. The following year he performed at the Glasgow International and New York comedy festivals.

In 2005 McLean was sought by Radio Clyde to provide sketches for the Bowie at Breakfast programme on Clyde 1. He soon became the co-host on the breakfast show with George Bowie, with the two men winning Sony Radio Academy Awards in the Best Breakfast and Entertainment Categories. McLean recorded a series of wind-up telephone calls for the programme, fooling stars that included Sean Connery, Rod Stewart and Joan Rivers. The daily calls became a series of four top selling CD releases, The Best of The 8.10 Sketches. McLean went on to host his own comedy sketch shows Friday Night Comedy and Des McLean's Sunday Sketch.

While still hosting daily radio shows McLean starred as The Tin Man in the Glasgow Pavilion Theatre pantomime Wizard of Oz in 2008 and Jiminy Cricket in Pinocchio in 2009. In 2008 his flair for more serious acting won him the lead role in the theatre drama Two Tales of Love and Loss.

McLean's live stand-up comedy DVDs became top sellers in Scotland, Live At Glasgow City Halls in 2007, Talkin' Aboot Live in 2009, and Is This The Way To Armadillo? in 2010, his stand-up show at The Clyde Auditorium was recorded as a television special for STV.

McLean left Radio Clyde in 2010 and has worked since on television as an on-location presenter in Scotland for The One Show on BBC One. He has also hosted various STV programmes including Hogmanay, The Hour and Too Good to Waste. Streetcast,  McLean's comedy podcast, has also received rave reviews and his many YouTube sketches have over a million views. In October 2011 McLean completed a tour of New Zealand playing venues such as The Vector Arena and Hawkes Bay Opera House.

In January 2012 it was reported that McLean would be playing politician Tommy Sheridan, who was convicted of perjury during 2010, in a new play I, Tommy, written by Rab C. Nesbitt creator Ian Pattison. Mclean's performance as Sheridan achieved critical acclaim from both critics and leading actors. David Hayman on BBC2 Review show described it as "Extraordinary." The Times called it "Pitch Perfect" and The Scotsman "devastatingly accurate".
The production played at the Edinburgh fringe, toured Scotland and finished the year at the Kings Theatre, Glasgow. In June 2013 McLean performed his stand up at the "Top of the Riv" in the iconic Riviera Hotel in Las Vegas.  There was a further run of I, Tommy in late 2013 with Rosie Kane playing herself.

In 2014 Des McLean announced a new nationwide tour and released a live DVD, Des Mclean's A-Z of Scotland. He then took the same show on the road in 2015, including a tour of Canada.

In 2017 Des created the online TV Series The Glasgow Trip with fellow Glasgow comedian Gary Little. They recorded twelve episodes and in 2019 the show was nominated for best online comedy at the Scottish Comedy Awards. In 2020 Des joined Nation radio hosting the weekend shows with Suzie McGuire.

In 2021 Des, in addition to continuing to compere and perform at comedy clubs the length and breadth of Scotland, took to the stage to play the part of Lisbon Lion Bertie Auld in the hilarious and heartwarming play Bend it like Bertie at Websters Theatre in Glasgow. The show, written by Glasgow playwright Jim Orr, was such a hit with theatre goers it embarked on a 2022 Scottish National tour performing in Oban, Dunoon, Falkirk, Inverness, Dundee, Kilbarchan, Bathgate, Livingston, Glenrothes, Giffnock, Musselburgh and Aberdeen with a further four night stint at Websters Theatre again. 

In 2023, 'Bend it Like Bertie' played a smash-hit run at the Pavilion Theatre, Glasgow in February and will now be performed at the Westgate Theater, Las Vegas in June.

References

External links
 www.desmclean.com

Living people
Scottish male comedians
Scottish radio presenters
Scottish stand-up comedians
Scottish television presenters
Year of birth missing (living people)
Comedians from Glasgow